is a Japanese footballer who plays for Tegevajaro Miyazaki.

Club statistics
Updated to 23 February 2020.

References

External links

Profile at Kagoshima United FC

1988 births
Living people
People from Yachiyo, Chiba
International Pacific University alumni
Association football people from Chiba Prefecture
Japanese footballers
J3 League players
Japan Football League players
Kagoshima United FC players
Saurcos Fukui players
Tegevajaro Miyazaki players
Association football goalkeepers